Marinobacter shengliensis is a Gram-negative, moderately halophilic, aerobic and rod-shaped bacterium from the genus of Marinobacter with a single polar flagellum, which has been isolated from saline soil which was contaminated with oil from the Shengli Oilfield in China.

References 

Alteromonadales
Bacteria described in 2015
Halophiles